Salahlı is a village in the Agstafa District of Azerbaijan.

References 

Populated places in Aghstafa District